The Drama League is an American theatrical association based in New York City. The organization was founded in 1910, in Chicago, as the Drama League of America, and chapters were established throughout the United States. In 1911, the organization began to publish a monthly magazine called The Drama. In 1922, the Drama League established the Drama League Award, and formalized its annual presentation in 1935.

History
The Drama League was founded in Chicago in 1910 as the Drama League of America. The national organization was created with two primary objectives: to influence the professional production of the best plays by alerting members to performances that warranted their support; and to ensure the continuity of professional theatre by educating the audiences of the future. In 1911 the organization being publishing a monthly magazine, The Drama.

By 1926, there were 37 local chapters, or centres, of the Drama League of America. After 17 years of existence, the New York Centre of the organization briefly disbanded, but reorganized in 1928.

In 1934, the League decided to recognize theatrical achievement in a different way. A committee consisting of Broadway producers and other theatre professionals created the first—and still the only—audience-selected award for distinguished performance in a theatrical production.

Directors' Project
In the 1980s, The Drama League experienced major transformation. It now also focused its efforts on providing a training program for directors, and a developmental and support program for playwrights. In 1984 the League initiated a program for young directors that combined training with intensive professional experience for entry-level or early career directors.

The program has three phases:
 A series of workshops under the guidance of prominent theatre professionals.
 Assistant directing assignments (one at a regional theatre, one at a New York Theatre).
 A Production with an Equity cast in New York City.

In 1988, the Directors' Project was expanded to include a summer directing program to run in conjunction with the Hangar Theatre in Ithaca, New York.  Participants in this program travel to the Hangar, where they each direct a children's show and at least two short plays, and serve as assistant director on a main stage production.

The Directors' Project also includes two other programs, the New Directors/New Works program, and the Assistant Directors program.

References

External links

 The Drama League official site
 Drama League of America records 1910–1931 at the New York Public Library

Theatre in New York City
Theatre in Chicago
Theatrical organizations in the United States